Tom Plant (born 31 March 1984) is an Australian cricketer. He played in thirteen first-class matches for South Australia between 2004 and 2008.

See also
 List of South Australian representative cricketers

References

External links
 

1984 births
Living people
Australian cricketers
South Australia cricketers
Cricketers from Adelaide